The Strath Committee was set up by the British Ministry of Defence to consider the implications of thermonuclear weapons for the United Kingdom.

The Strath Report, issued in 1955, and finally declassified in 2002, estimated the type of damage and casualties Great Britain would suffer from what the Committee considered a "limited" thermonuclear attack of 10 hydrogen bombs dropped on UK cities. The result of the attack, according to the Committee's Report, would be "utter devastation". There would be up to 12 million deaths, 3 million from radiation poisoning. The Committee estimated a further four million serious casualties, which would overwhelm the British medical system. Half of Britain's industry would be destroyed, logistics and distribution systems would break down, and food and water would be contaminated, leaving the 40 million survivors in "siege conditions."

"The Report found it impossible to predict whether Britain could recover with the social and economic fabric of the country destroyed - in even such a limited attack."

The Committee's Report was discussed in a DEFE (Chiefs of Staff, Ministry of Defence) paper entitled "An Appreciation of the Likely Form and Duration of a Future Major War: With Reference to the Problem of Stockpiling in the United Kingdom" (DEFE 5/80, COS (57) 278, 18 Dec 1957).

References

1955 in the United Kingdom
Ministry of Defence (United Kingdom)
Cold War history of the United Kingdom